Dr. Ali Sindi (is an Iraqi Kurdish politician and Minister for Planning for the Kurdistan Regional Government.

References

1965 births
Living people
Place of birth missing (living people)
Iraqi Kurdistani politicians